Paul Morrison is the name of:
 Paul Morrison (director) (born 1944), British film director & screenwriter
 Paul Morrison (footballer) (1952–2011), Australian rules footballer
 Paul J. Morrison (born 1954), American politician and lawyer
 Paul Morrison (artist) (born 1966), English painter